Verkhneye is a rural locality (a selo) in Brasovsky District, Bryansk Oblast, Russia. The population was 25 as of 2013. There is 1 street.

References 

Rural localities in Brasovsky District